The 1968 Speedway World Team Cup was the ninth edition of the FIM Speedway World Team Cup to determine the team world champions.

The final took place at Wembley Stadium in London. The title was won by for the first time by the Great Britain national speedway team. The previous eight editions had all been won by Sweden (five wins) and Poland (three wins).

Results

World final
 21 September
  Wembley Stadium

See also
 1968 Individual Speedway World Championship
 1968 Speedway World Pairs Championship

References

Speedway World Team Cup
1968 in speedway